Amelia Lyn Lewis (born February 23, 1991) is an American professional golfer. In December 2010 at age 19, Lewis became the first Jacksonville, Florida, native to be fully exempt on the LPGA Tour since Colleen Walker in 1982, some 28 years earlier. In the following year (December 2011) Lewis became the first Jacksonville native to ever hold tour cards on both the LPGA Tour and Ladies European Tour.

Lewis holds over 53 titles in junior, amateur and professional golf. She is a three-time All-First Coast Player of the Year and the 2009 Florida First Coast Scholar Athlete. She hold the course records at the Valley Course at the TPC Sawgrass where she won the 2008 CMAA World Championship and Overall championship Titles.

Early life and education
Lewis was born in Jacksonville, Florida, the daughter of Georgina (Hurst) and Chris Lewis. She is the oldest of four children and a fifth generation Jacksonville native.  Lewis attended the private preparatory school The Bolles School, graduating in 2009 with Honors. She attended one semester at the University of Florida where she played on the women's golf team.  She left college in December 2009 to pursue her professional golf career.

Amateur career
As a junior and amateur golfer, Lewis has often played and won on the Women's and Men's amateur tours in North Florida. In May 2008 she won the annual amateur CMAA World Championship & Overall championship Titles that launched her name to the National level across the United States. Lewis earned her entry from the Women's Champion status of the San Jose Country Club in Jacksonville, Florida. She went to the National Championship and set a new course record for her first day score of a 67 (5 under par) on the Valley Course, and then won the CMAA women's division with a total score of 2 under par on the TPC Sawgrass. Later, in the CMAA Ultimate Division against the Men's Champion and Senior Men's Champion, Women's Champion Lewis, at 17 years old, completed a 15-foot birdie putt on the stadium course's 18th hole to win 2008 Ultimate Champion.  One year later after her high school graduation, Lewis won the 107th North and South Women's Amateur Golf Championship in 2009, where her name currently resides on the walls of Pinehurst Resort in Pinehurst, North Carolina, with golf's greatest. The North and South Women's Amateur is an invitational tournament, participants are chosen based upon their performance in national amateur championships and overall competitive record. Also in the summer of 2009, she qualified for the U.S. Women's Amateur and upset top seeded Danielle Kang in the first round of match play.

For nine months from August 2009 until she turned professional in April 2010 Lewis held the third-place ranking on the Golfweek Women's Amateur golf rankings right behind first place Lexi Thompson. After receiving a full exempt status of a class A-3 from the LPGA she turned professional and joined the LPGA Symetra tour in April 2010. She won her first professional tournament six months later on the Suncoast Series Professional Tour.

Notable amateur wins
2009 North and South Women's Amateur
2008 NCC CMAA Ultimate Champion * playoff of men & senior men's champions
2008 NCC CMAA Women's Champion
2008 FHSAA Class 1A Regional Champion
2008 FHSAA Class 1A District Champion
2008 JAGA Junior Girls 15-18 Champion 
2008 AJGA Mayakoba Junior Golf Classic Champion
2008 Callaway Golf PGA Junior Series New Mexico State Champion 
2008 SJCC Ladies Club Champion
2008 SJGT Hampton Club Junior Classic Champion
2008 IJGT Amelia Island Plantation Champion
2007 San Jose CC 18 & U Ladies Long Drive Champion 
2007 FHSAA Class 1A Regional Champion 
2007 FHSAA Class 1A District Champion
2007 JAGA Junior Girls 15-18 Champion
2006 San Jose CC Ladies Long Drive Champion 12/2006
2006 FHSAA Class 1A Regional 2 Champion 10/2006
2006 FHSAA Ponte Vedra Invitational Medalist / Champion
2006 Callaway Golf PGA Junior Series Santa Ana Golf Club 13 – 15 Girls Champion
2006 Callaway Golf PGA Junior Series Shaker Hills Golf Club 13 – 15 Girls Champion
2006 Callaway Golf PGA Junior Series The Walker Course at Clemson 13-15 Girls Champion
2006 FWSGA State Amateur Match Play - Championship Consolation Flight Champion

Amateur awards
2009 Florida Times-Union Scholar Athlete
2009 Van Etten Bent Award
2008 Florida All-First Coast Player of the Year 
2008 Rolex All American – Honorable Mention
2008 A.C. Skinner Award, The Bolles School
2008 The President's Award, The Bolles School
2007 Van Etten Bent Award
2007 Florida All-First Coast Player of the Year
2006  Florida All-First Coast Player of the Year
2006 Golf News Female Junior of the Year 
2006 Callaway Junior PGA Jr. Series Player of the Year 13-15 Age Division
2004 SJGT Southeastern Junior Golf Girl Player of the Year 
2004 Florida All-First Coast First Team 
2004 MVP The Bolles School Girls Golf Team
2003 SJGT Southeastern Junior Golf Girls overall Most Improved Player

References

External links

American female golfers
LPGA Tour golfers
Ladies European Tour golfers
Golfers from Jacksonville, Florida
Bolles School alumni
1991 births
Living people
21st-century American women